Sérgio Barboza da Silva Júnior (born 30 May 1993) is a Brazilian professional footballer who plays as a winger.

Club career
Born in Rio de Janeiro, Brazil, Barboza made his senior debut with Costa Rican Primera División side Limón in the 2015–16 season.

Barboza played for the Flamengo U20 side, but made no appearances on the senior squad and was transferred to Macaé in 2013. He then signed a two-year contract with Brazilian club Olaria and played for the club until 2015. In mid-2015, Barboza signed a year contract with Primera División side Limón. Barboza penned a deal with Guatemalan club Comunicaciones B in 2017, playing in Liga Nacional.

He then moved to Juticalpa in mid-2017 in the Honduran second division and then transferred to Lao Premier League side Master 7, where he remained until 2018. He played for C-League side Svay Rieng and returned to Master 7 in 2019 for a second spell at the Lao side.

Barboza was transferred to Punjab where he rose to fame. He played 15 games and scored 4 goals for the Punjab side in the I-League. He played his first game for the club on 1 December 2019, which they lost. In his third appearance Barboza scored a goal against defending champions Chennai City, and on 12 December 2019, he led the team to their first win in the season following a loss and a draw against East Bengal.

Barboza managed to score a brace against Aizawl on 20 December 2019, which equalized the game 3-3, and the fourth of his professional career against Gokulam Kerala, which secured his team's win.

In 2021, Barboza joined newly formed Delhi FC and appeared in the 130th edition of Durand Cup. He later appeared in the 2021 I-League Qualifiers, in which they finished on third position and he scored 3 goals.

Rajasthan United
In August 2022, Rajasthan United completed the signing of Barboza, on a one-year deal.

On 25 August, he missed the winning penalty on his debut for the club against East Bengal in the Durand Cup, in a 0–0 stalemate. Eleven days later, he scored his first goal for the club against Indian Navy which helped Rajasthan United qualify for the knockout stage of the Durand Cup. An excellent through ball by Gyamar Nikum was met by Barboza in the 89th-minute and he finished confidently past the goalkeeper to seal a 2–0 win for his team. He was also part of his team's Baji Rout Cup win in Odisha.

Career statistics

Club

Honours
Minerva Punjab
Bodousa Cup runner-up: 2019

Rajasthan United
Baji Rout Cup: 2022

References

External links

1993 births
Living people
Association football forwards
I-League players
CR Flamengo footballers
Macaé Esporte Futebol Clube players
Olaria Atlético Clube players
Limón F.C. players
Comunicaciones F.C. players
Juticalpa F.C. players
Master 7 FC players
RoundGlass Punjab FC players
Honduran Liga Nacional de Ascenso players
Preah Khan Reach Svay Rieng FC players
Liga FPD players
Liga Nacional de Fútbol de Guatemala players
Campeonato Brasileiro Série C
Brazilian expatriate footballers
Brazilian expatriate sportspeople in Laos
Brazilian expatriate sportspeople in Honduras
Brazilian expatriate sportspeople in Cambodia
Brazilian expatriate sportspeople in India
Brazilian expatriate sportspeople in Guatemala
Expatriate footballers in Laos
Expatriate footballers in India
Expatriate footballers in Guatemala
Expatriate footballers in Cambodia
Footballers from Rio de Janeiro (city)
Brazilian footballers
Rajasthan United FC players